Churchland High School is a public high school in Portsmouth, Virginia in the United States. It is administered by Portsmouth Public Schools. The school colors are black and orange. The mascot is a "Trucker".

Churchland is designated as a magnet school for the visual and performing arts, with subjects including dance, chorus, orchestra, band, drama, and the visual arts.

Sports
On January 21, 2023, a 22-year-old junior varsity assistant basketball coach impersonated a 13-year-old player during a game against Nansemond River High School. The coaches for the junior varsity team were fired after an investigation into the incident. The girls and junior varsity teams voted not to continue with their season and will forfeit future games.

Notable alumni
 Richard Thomas Shea (1927–1953), posthumous recipient of the Medal of Honor (1953), Virginia Tech track star
 W. Nathaniel "Nat" Howell (1939–2020), State Department Foreign Service officer, former ambassador to Kuwait; professor emeritus, the University of Virginia
 L. Glenn Perry (1944–1998), first Chief Accountant of the United States Securities and Exchange Commission
 Denny Riddleberger (born 1945), former MLB player (Washington Senators, Cleveland Indians)
 Ryan Glynn (born 1974), former Major League Baseball (MLB) player (Texas Rangers, Toronto Blue Jays, Oakland Athletics)
 Arthur Moats (born 1988), National Football League linebacker (Buffalo Bills, Pittsburgh Steelers)

References

Schools in Portsmouth, Virginia
Public high schools in Virginia
Magnet schools in Virginia
1840 establishments in Virginia
Educational institutions established in 1840